Markéta Gregorová (born 14 January 1993 in Most) is a Czech politician, who was elected as a Member of the European Parliament in the 2019 election, representing the Czech Pirate Party. Gregorová serves as the Vice-Chair of the Delegation to the Euronest Parliamentary Assembly, and is a member of the Committee on International Trade and the Special Committee on Foreign Interference in all Democratic Processes in the European Union, including Disinformation.

Early work 

Gregorová was the third-ranked candidate in the 2014 European Parliament election, but was not elected. She was the president of the European Pirate Party from December 2018.

European Parliament

Election
Gregorová co-created the 2019 common electoral program for the European pirate parties that was signed in Luxembourg in February. She was elected as a Member of the European Parliament in the 2019 European Parliament election, as the second candidate on the Pirate Party list. Gregorová serves as the Vice-Chair of the Delegation to the Euronest Parliamentary Assembly, and is a member of the Committee on International Trade and the Special Committee on Foreign Interference in all Democratic Processes in the European Union, including Disinformation.

Among her priorities are transparency in negotiations of European Union free trade agreements such as the Transatlantic Trade and Investment Partnership (TTIP) and addressing EU involvement in international arms sales to war zones.

Committee assignments
Gregorová is a member of the following Committees of the European Parliament:
Delegation to the Euronest Parliamentary Assembly, Vice-Chair
European Parliament Committee on International Trade
Special Committee on Foreign Interference in all Democratic Processes in the European Union, including Disinformation
Delegation to the EU-Armenia Parliamentary Partnership Committee, the EU-Azerbaijan Parliamentary Cooperation Committee and the EU-Georgia Parliamentary Association Committee

See also 

European Neighbourhood Policy
Marcel Kolaja
Mikuláš Peksa

References

External links
 
 Markéta Gregorová on Czech Pirate Party website
 Markéta Gregorová on the European Parliament website

1993 births
Women MEPs for the Czech Republic
Czech Pirate Party MEPs
Living people
MEPs for the Czech Republic 2019–2024
People from Most (city)
21st-century Czech women politicians
Masaryk University alumni